Guhagar (Marathi pronunciation: [ɡuɦaːɡəɾ]) is a census town in Ratnagiri district in the Indian state of Maharashtra. Guhagar is known for its virgin beach, coir items, coconuts, betel nuts and mainly Alphonso mangoes. The economy of Guhagar boomed after the Dabhol Power Company, a few kilometres north was commissioned in the early 1990s. Hotels sprung up and residents were given well-paid jobs.

Guhagar is famous for Durga Devi temple, Guhagar and Shree Vyadeshwar temple. Guhagar's coconut is very famous in Konkan.

Geography
A word Guhagar means cave house in local language
It has an average elevation of 10 metres (33 feet). Guhagar has been featured in several films, the recent one being the Marathi Film Killa (film)

Demographics
 India census, Guhagar had a population of 3205. Males constitute 52% of the population and females 48%. Guhagar has an average literacy rate of 82%, higher than the national average of 59.5%: male literacy is 86%, and female literacy is 78%. In Guhagar, 10% of the population is under 6 years of age.

Gallery

References

Talukas in Maharashtra
Cities and towns in Ratnagiri district
Tourist attractions in Ratnagiri district